Mermaid Quay is a waterfront shopping and leisure district in the Cardiff Bay area of Cardiff, Wales. The  development was opened in 1999, and includes restaurants, bars, cafes and shops.

History 

Mermaid Quay was at the centre of the regeneration of the Bay by the Cardiff Bay Development Corporation (CBDC). Part of the British Government's Urban Development Programme to regenerate deprived and run-down inner city areas. The CBDC was set up in April 1987 to regenerate  of derelict docklands of Cardiff and Penarth - once the world's largest coal exporting port – to create Europe's largest waterfront development.

The Welsh Industrial and Maritime Museum, which held exhibits illustrating the industrial and maritime history of Wales, was demolished to make way for the development.  The collection was saved, but the majority remains in storage at Nant Garw with only a limited few items on display at the National Waterfront Museum in Swansea.

Before the completion of the Cardiff Bay Barrage in 1999, Cardiff Bay was tidal, with extensive expanses of mud flats exposed at low tide.

Mermaid Quay was designed by architects Benoy and opened in August 1999. Since that time there has been significant regeneration of the Bay including the construction of Lloyd George Avenue – a new link road between the city centre and the Bay – numerous iconic buildings, and residential and commercial developments.

Media 

Cardiff Bay and Mermaid Quay have provided the backdrop for numerous episodes of programmes, such as the BBC’s science fiction drama series Doctor Who and Torchwood, with the fictional entrances (now decorated as Ianto's Shrine) to the underground Torchwood 3 Institute located in Roald Dahl Plass.

Transport

Train services run every 12 minutes between Cardiff Bay and Cardiff Queen Street stations, providing connections to the rest of Cardiff, its Valleys, and the Vale of Glamorgan.
Boat: Aquabus and Cardiff CATS provide the Cardiff Waterbus services. The former travels to and from the city centre, whereas the latter travels to and from Penarth.
Bus:  Various Cardiff Bus services serve Mermaid Quay, including the BayCar service from the city centre, which operates every 10 minutes Monday to Saturday and every 20 minutes on Sundays and during the evening.
Cycle:  Off-road cycle routes run to Mermaid Quay from the City Centre in the north, and from the Cardiff International Sports Village in the west, running beside the A4232. Numerous cycle parking facilities are available in the area. Transport for Wales permits the carriage of cycles on services between Cardiff Bay and Cardiff Queen Street.
Mermaid Quay has a 380 space car park opposite Techniquest.

Gallery

Notes

External links 
 A map of Cardiff Bay
 
 Cardiff Harbour Authority

Tourist attractions in Cardiff
Districts of Cardiff
Shopping in Cardiff
Redevelopment projects in Cardiff